Kurt Klingler (born 9 September 1928) is a Swiss former sports shooter. He competed in the 25 metre pistol event at the 1968 Summer Olympics.

References

External links
 

1928 births
Possibly living people
Swiss male sport shooters
Olympic shooters of Switzerland
Shooters at the 1968 Summer Olympics
People from Bülach
Sportspeople from the canton of Zürich